Darrel Rondel Brown (born October 11, 1984) is a sprinter from Trinidad and Tobago who specializes in the 100 metres and the 200 metres.

In the beginning of his career, he was awarded the Austin Sealy Trophy for the
most outstanding athlete at the CARIFTA Games twice, both in 1999 and 2000, after becoming the first athlete to win back-to-back titles in both the 100 and 200 metres (Youth). After switching to the "junior" age group in 2001, Brown won the 100 metres for three consecutive years (2001–2003), becoming the first athlete ever to do so.

He also performed well in World Youth and Junior Championships. At the 2000 World Junior Championships he finished fourth in both 100 metres and 4 x 100 metres relay. After setting a new World Youth Record over 100 meters at 10.24 on April 14, 2001, he then won gold medals at the 2001 World Youth Championships and the 2002 World Junior Championships. In 2002 he also won a bronze medal in the 4 × 100 metres relay. He also helped win a silver medal in relay at the 2001 World Championships for seniors.

Under the guidance of Henry Rolle Brown ran the 100 m at the 2003 World Championships where he finished second behind Kim Collins. In addition to the silver medal, he set the junior world record of 10.01 seconds in the quarter finals stage. He also won a relay silver medal at the 2003 Pan American Games, and an individual gold medal at the 2003 Central American and Caribbean Championships.

In June 2005 he set a new personal best with 9.99, thus becoming one of the few athletes to run below 10 seconds. At the 2005 World Championships, Brown was knocked out in the semi finals with 10.16 seconds. In the relay event, however, he won a silver medal with the Trinidad and Tobago team in a new national record of 38.10 seconds. He later finished fourth at the 2005 World Athletics Final. He also won two gold medals at the 2005 Central American and Caribbean Championships.

Half a year later, at the 2006 Commonwealth Games, he exited in the quarter-finals. The same thing happened at the 2008 Olympic Games. He won another individual gold medal at the 2008 Central American and Caribbean Championships.

He competed at the 2008 Beijing Olympics, reaching the quarter-finals of the 100 metres, but he pulled up in the race, finishing in 10.93 seconds.

At the 2009 World Championships in Berlin, he competed as part of the  relay for Trinidad and Tobago which finished second behind Jamaica in a national record of 37.62s. Brown was the first leg for team T.T.O. Jamaica's victory was, at that time, a championship record of 37.31s.

Personal bests

All information taken from IAAF Profile.

References

External links
 
IAAF "Focus on Athletes" article
 Best of Trinidad

1984 births
Living people
Trinidad and Tobago male sprinters
Olympic athletes of Trinidad and Tobago
Athletes (track and field) at the 2004 Summer Olympics
Athletes (track and field) at the 2008 Summer Olympics
Pan American Games medalists in athletics (track and field)
Athletes (track and field) at the 2003 Pan American Games
Athletes (track and field) at the 2011 Pan American Games
Commonwealth Games competitors for Trinidad and Tobago
Athletes (track and field) at the 2006 Commonwealth Games
Athletes (track and field) at the 2014 Commonwealth Games
World Athletics Championships athletes for Trinidad and Tobago
World Athletics Championships medalists
People from Arima
Pan American Games silver medalists for Trinidad and Tobago
Medalists at the 2003 Pan American Games